Urban–Rogers–Meyer syndrome, also known as Prader–Willi habitus, osteopenia, and camptodactyly or Urban syndrome, is an extremely rare inherited congenital disorder first described by Urban et al. (1979). It is characterized by genital anomalies, mental retardation, obesity, contractures of fingers, and osteoporosis, though further complications are known.

References

Further reading
 
 Jablonski's Syndromes Database: Bibliography

External links 

Genetic disorders with OMIM but no gene
Rare diseases
Syndromes